Vilas Tare is an ex Shiv Sena politician from now in BJP Palghar district.  He was a member of Maharashtra Legislative Assembly representing Boisar Vidhan Sabha constituency from 2009 ro 2019. Vilas Tare belongs to Bahujan Vikas Aghadi Party before joining Shiv Sena. About his childhood life he belongs from a Poor and Aadivasi family, as he is a very helpful person, he think to make changes in Maharashtra.Just to make changes he decided to join Politics and he succeed also. He was a Aamdar in Bahujan Vikas Aghadi Party.

Positions held
 2009: Elected to Maharashtra Legislative Assembly 
 2014: Elected to Maharashtra Legislative Assembly

References

External links
 The Shivsena

Shiv Sena politicians
Members of the Maharashtra Legislative Assembly
Marathi politicians
Living people
Year of birth missing (living people)
Bahujan Vikas Aghadi politicians